Pavel Tseslyukevich (born 11 May 1995) is a Belarusian professional footballer who plays for Dnepr Mogilev.

Honours
Gomel
Belarusian Cup winner: 2021–22

References

External links 
 
 

1995 births
Living people
Belarusian footballers
Association football midfielders
FC Neman Grodno players
FC Baranovichi players
FC Granit Mikashevichi players
FC Gomel players
FC Dnepr Mogilev players